The Kissimmee River is a river in south-central Florida, United States that forms the north part of the Everglades wetlands area. The river begins at East Lake Tohopekaliga south of Orlando, flowing south through Lake Kissimmee into the large, shallow Lake Okeechobee. Hurricane-related floods in 1947 prompted channelization of the meandering lower stretch, completed by 1970. The straightened course reduced wetland habitat and worsened pollution. In response, ongoing efforts since the 1990s have partially restored the river's original state and revitalized the ecosystem (see Restoration of the Everglades).

Course
The Kissimmee River arises in Osceola County as the outflow from East Lake Tohopekaliga, passing through Lake Tohopekaliga, Lake Cypress, Lake Hatchineha and Lake Kissimmee. Below Lake Kissimmee, the river forms the boundary between Osceola County and Polk County, between Highlands County and Okeechobee County, and between Glades County and Okeechobee County before it flows into Lake Okeechobee. The river was originally  in length,  of which was between Lake Kissimmee and Lake Okeechobee. It forms the headwaters of the Kissimmee River-Lake Okeechobee-Everglades ecosystem.

The floodplain of the river supports a diverse community of waterfowl, wading birds, fish, and other wildlife.

Flood control
The 1947 Atlantic hurricane season, which included the 1947 Fort Lauderdale Hurricane and the 1947 October Hurricane, produced very heavy rainfall and flooding over most of central and southern Florida. Florida requested federal assistance in controlling future floods, and in 1954 the United States Congress authorized the canalization of the Kissimmee River. From 1962 to 1970 the United States Army Corps of Engineers dredged the C-38 Canal down the Kissimmee valley, shortening the  distance from Lake Kissimmee to Lake Okeechobee to just . It has since been realized that this project damaged the river, with the faster water flow leading to major environmental problems in the Kissimmee Valley and Lake Okeechobee. Efforts are currently underway to reverse the process and re-introduce the many oxbows in the river that slowed the water.

Effects of channelization
After the river channel was straightened,  of floodplain below Lake Kissimmee dried out, reducing the quality of waterfowl habitat by ninety percent, and the number of herons, egrets and wood storks by two-thirds. Catches of largemouth bass in the river were consistently worse after the channelization. While the Kissimmee was not a significant source of pollution for Lake Okeechobee before channelization, in the 1970s and later the river contributed about 25% of the nitrogen and 20% of the phosphorus flowing into the lake.

References in popular culture
In protest to the canalization of the river and its resultant damage to the habitat, Florida author Piers Anthony based the plot of the tenth Xanth novel, Vale of the Vole, around the straightening of the "Kiss-Mee River," an obvious parody to "Kissimmee."

The river was mentioned in a lyric of Josh Turner's song "Alligator Stroll".

Restoration

Efforts to restore the Kissimmee River to its original flow were approved by Congress in 1992, and began with modification to the headwater lakes in 1997. The United States Army Corps of Engineers had initially hoped to complete the project in 2015. In 2006, the South Florida Water Management District had acquired enough land along the river and in the upper chain of lakes to complete restoration. In all,  of the Kissimmee River will be restored.

A 2009 report from the Corps of Engineers went into detail with the issues and plans for the Kissimmee River restoration.

Already, wildlife is returning to the restored sections of river. When flooding began again, muck and smothering aquatic weeds were flushed out. Sandbars reemerged. Encroaching dry land trees began dying back. Once-dormant plants began to reestablish themselves. The species included pink-tipped smartweed, horsetail, sedges, rushes, arrowhead, duck potato and pickerel weed. Flooding and continuous flow increased levels of dissolved oxygen in the water, creating near perfect conditions for aquatic invertebrates such as insects, mollusks, works, crayfish and freshwater shrimp. This, in turn, boosted fish populations and it led to a rise in bird and alligator populations. The entire food chain benefitted. This is one reason that the Kissimmee River restoration is considered to be the largest true ecosystem restoration project in the world, attracting ecologists from other states and countries.

See also
Camp Mack's River Resort

References

External links
Kissimmee River information from the South Florida Water Management District
Kissimmee River Restoration Project information from the U.S. Army Corps of Engineers, Jacksonville District

Canals in Florida
Rivers of Florida
Tributaries of Lake Okeechobee
Rivers of Osceola County, Florida
Rivers of Polk County, Florida
Bodies of water of Highlands County, Florida
Bodies of water of Okeechobee County, Florida
Bodies of water of Glades County, Florida